The Augustana Evangelical Lutheran Church (previously the Augustana Lutheran Synod and also Scandinavian Evangelical Lutheran Augustana Synod in North America and Swedish Evangelical Lutheran Augustana Synod in North America) was a Lutheran church body in the United States that was one of the churches that merged into the Lutheran Church in America (LCA) in 1962. It had its roots among the Swedish immigrants in the 19th century.

In 1961, just before its merger into the LCA, the Augustana Synod had 1,353 pastors, 1,219 congregations, and 619,040 members.

Formation
The Scandinavian Evangelical Lutheran Augustana Synod in North America was established in 1860. The organizing meeting was held at the Jefferson Prairie Settlement, near Clinton, Wisconsin on June 5–8. A group of Swedish Lutheran pastors including Jonas Swensson, Lars Paul Esbjörn, Tuve Hasselquist, Eric Norelius, and Erland Carlsson pioneered development of the Augustana Synod.

Augustana is a shortened version of Confessio Augustana, the Latin name of one of Lutheranism's defining documents, the Augsburg Confession, presented in 1530 in the German city of Augsburg. Along with the Swedish members of the church were Norwegian and Danish members who left the church in 1870 to form the Conference of the Norwegian-Danish Evangelical Lutheran Church of America and the Norwegian Augustana Synod. Also in 1870, the synod was renamed the Swedish Evangelical Lutheran Augustana Synod in North America. In 1894 the name was changed to Evangelical Lutheran Augustana Synod in North America. In 1948, the name Augustana Evangelical Lutheran Church was adopted.

In 1922, the synod was given equal standing in Sweden with the Swedish synods.

Originally somewhat conservative, the church gradually turned more liberal after historical criticism was introduced at its seminary. The Augustana Theological Seminary was located on the campus of Augustana College in Rock Island, Illinois. It was later merged into the Lutheran School of Theology at Chicago upon the formation of the Lutheran Church in America in 1962.

Augustana Church was the direct parent of several liberal arts colleges in the United States: Augustana College in Rock Island, Illinois; Gustavus Adolphus College in St. Peter, Minnesota; Bethany College in Lindsborg, Kansas; California Lutheran University in Thousand Oaks, California; Midland University in Fremont, Nebraska; and the defunct Upsala College in East Orange, New Jersey. Augustana and Gustavus Adolphus consistently rank among the top 100 liberal arts colleges in the U.S., and the other institutions are recognized as strong regional colleges.

While the Augustana Church had only 600,000 members when the Lutheran Church in America was formed, its influence on its successor bodies has been significant as they incorporated many of Augustana's emphases on mission, ecumenism, and social service. Herbert W. Chilstrom, the first presiding bishop of the Evangelical Lutheran Church in America, was a graduate of the Augustana Theological Seminary and was ordained to Augustana's ministry in 1958. Included among the Augustana-founded congregations is Mount Olivet Lutheran Church in Minneapolis, Minnesota, the largest Lutheran congregation in the world with over 13,000 members.

Presidents
Tuve Hasselquist 1860–1870
Jonas Swensson 1870–1873
Eric Norelius 1874–1881
Erland Carlsson 1881–1888
Sven Peter August Lindahl 1888–1891
P. J. Svärd 1891–1899
Eric Norelius 1899–1911
L. A. Johnston 1911–1918
Gustaf Albert Brandelle 1918–1935
Petrus Olaf Bersell 1935–1951
Oscar A. Benson 1951–1959
Malvin H. Lundeen 1959–1962

Conferences

Final statistics of the Augustana Evangelical Lutheran Church (December 31, 1961).

References

Further reading

 Anderson, Philip J., "From Compulsion to Persuasion: Voluntary Religion and the Swedish Immigrant Experience," Swedish-American Historical Quarterly, 66#1 (2015), 3-23.  

Arden, G. Everett (1958) Half a Million Swedes (America's Lutherans. Omar Bonderud and Charles Lutz, editors. Columbus OH: Wartburg Press. pages 28–30).
 Blanck, Dag, "Two Churches, One Community: The Augustana Synod and the Covenant Church, 1860–1920," Swedish-American Historical Quarterly 63 (April–July 2012), 158–73.
 Blanck, Dag. The Creation of an Ethnic Identity: Being Swedish American in the Augustana Synod, 1860-1917, (2007) 256 pp )

 Cimino, Richard, ed. Lutherans Today: American Lutheran Identity in the Twenty-First Century (Eerdmans, 2003).
 Erling, Maria Elizabeth, and Mark Granquist. The Augustana Story: Shaping Lutheran Identity in North America (Augsburg Books, 2008).

Follstad, Virginia (2007) The Augustana Evangelical Lutheran Church in Print (Plymouth, United Kingdom: Scarecrow Press)
 Granquist, Mark, "Parallel Paths: The Augustana Synod and the Covenant Church, 1920–1945," Swedish-American Historical Quarterly, 63 (April–July 2012), 174–86.
Granquist, Mark (2008) The Augustana Story: Shaping Lutheran Identity in North America (Augsburg Fortress Publishers) 
 Hultgren, Arland. "Augustana and Lutheran identity in America." Augustana Heritage (2012). online

 Olson, Oscar W. The Augustana Lutheran Church in America: Pioneer Period, 1846-1860 (1950) full text online also online review

 Stephenson, George M. The Religious Aspects of Swedish Immigration (1932).

Histoiography
 Granquist, Mark Alan. "Five American Lutheran Histories." Lutheran Quarterly 12.2 (1998): 197-209.

External links
Augustana Heritage group
The Lutherans in America; a story of struggle, progress, influence and marvelous growth. 
The Augustana Synod : a brief review of its history, 1860-1910. 
Evangelical Lutheran Church in America family tree

Swedish migration to North America
Evangelical Lutheran Church in America predecessor churches
Religious organizations established in 1860
Lutheranism in the United States
Lutheran denominations established in the 19th century
1860 establishments in Wisconsin
Lutheran denominations in North America